Funny You Should Ask is a syndicated American game show that launched in 2017. It is distributed by Entertainment Studios and hosted by Jon Kelley. Reruns air on the Entertainment Studios cable television channel Comedy.TV, on Game Show Network, and through syndication.

Regular and frequent comics on the show have included Jon Lovitz, Louie Anderson, Bill Bellamy, Sheryl Underwood, Tim Meadows, Jackée Harry, Howie Mandel, Cedric the Entertainer, Caroline Rhea, Natasha Leggero, Bill Engvall, Cheryl Hines, Gabriel Iglesias, Anthony Anderson, Maz Jobrani, Jamie Kennedy, Jodi Miller, Billy Gardell, Pauly Shore, Whitney Cummings, Dave Coulier, Sherri Shepherd, Tom Arnold, Tiffany Haddish, Kathy Griffin, Cheryl Hines, Tommy Davidson, Vivica A. Fox and Raven-Symone. Byron Allen, who is the creator and executive producer of the show, also appears often.

Lovitz (lower left) and Allen (upper right) are regular panelists. Louie Anderson (lower right) was a regular before his death; since then Mandel has occupied Anderson's spot, where a plaque reading "Louie's Chair" is on the chair's left arm. The middle chairs on each row are occupied by female panelists, with the celebrity in the upper left chair rotating. 

The program used "Happy" by Pharrell Williams as its theme song from its first season, and a similar-sounding tune from the second season onward.

The series is slightly related in title and format to the 1968 version of Funny You Should Ask, a game show that aired on ABC.

Funny You Should Ask was renewed into the 2022–23 season, for a total of six syndicated seasons (new episodes were produced during the first four seasons). It was the second double-season renewal, the first being in 2018.

Gameplay 
Six comical celebrities are individually asked for their answer to a trivia question (the comedians first give an obvious "joke" answer and then a legitimate response). Taking turns between the two contestants, they are asked if the answer given by the panel is true or false (right or wrong). If the answer is correct, the contestant wins $100 in the first round, $200 in second, and $300 in third. Six questions are asked in each of the first two rounds, while the third round allows as many questions until the bell sounds, signifying that time is up. Whoever is behind, or in a case of a tie went last, plays first in subsequent rounds. Whoever has the most money on their scoreboard is the champion, and has a chance to win an additional $5,000 in the "Big Money" bonus round. A numerical question is asked about one of the celebrities to both contestants, before the game show starts, which is used to determine the champion in the event of a tie. Whoever is closest to the total amount wins the game.

In the bonus round, three multiple-choice questions are asked to which the celebrities give answers, only one of which is true. The questions get progressively harder and more answers are given for each successive question: three for the first, four for the second and six for the third and final question (with the last answer always being an obvious "joke" answer). The champion, if successful, wins $5,000. However, if any question is missed, the bonus round ends.

References

External links 

2010s American comedy game shows
2020s American comedy game shows
2017 American television series debuts
First-run syndicated television programs in the United States
Television series by Entertainment Studios